In universal algebra, a quasi-identity is an implication of the form

s1 = t1 ∧ … ∧ sn = tn → s = t

where s1, ..., sn, t1, ..., tn, s, and t are terms built up from variables using the operation symbols of the specified signature.

A quasi-identity amounts to a conditional equation for which the conditions themselves are equations. Alternatively, it can be seen as a disjunction of inequations and one equation s1 ≠ t1 ∨ ... ∨ sn ≠ tn ∨ s = t—that is, as a definite Horn clause. A quasi-identity with n = 0 is an ordinary identity or equation, so quasi-identities are a generalization of identities.

See also 

 Quasivariety

References 

  Free online edition.

Universal algebra